Ponnamma Babu is an Indian actress best known for her work in Malayalam cinema. She has acted in more than 300 films,  TV serials and Comedy shows . She made her debut in Padanayakan in 1996.

Personal life

Ponnamma was born to Mathai and Achamma, as eldest of four children, in Bharananganam, Palai, Kottayam. She had her primary education from St George High School, Aruvithura. She made her debut in Padanayakan in 1996. While studying in school she joined Nrithabhavan Balesangham, Poonjar and later in Surabhila Drama troupe, Ettumaanur. She is married to Babu, the owner of Surabhila Drama troupe.  Ponnamma's daughter Pinky is an upcoming actress who made her debut through Nakshathrangal, a 2014 Malayalam movie whereas the first film she acted, Mr. Pavanayi 99.99, is not yet released.

Filmography

 Soubhagyam (1993) as Drama artist
 Uppukandam Brothers (1993) as Pankajakshan's wife
 Ishtamanu Nooruvattam (1996) as Singer for interview
 Padanayakan (1996) as Seetha's mother
 Udyanapalakan (1996) as Shantha
 Swarnakireedam (1996) as Padmavathi
 Excuse Me Ethu Collegila (1996) as Gayathri's mother
 Kaliveedu (1996) as Ramani
 Kireedamillatha Rajakkanmar(1996) as Hostel warden
 Asuravamsam (1997) as Jayamohan's mother
 Snehasindooram (1997) as Nirmala
 Karunyam (1997) as Indu's mother
 Vamsam (1997) as Thommichan's wife
 Nee Varuvolum (1997) as Revathy's mother
 Manasam (1997) as Rajalakshmi's mother
 Irattakuttikalude Achan (1997) as Anupama's mother
 Adukkala Rahasyam Angaadippaattu (1997) as Indira Kaimal
 Mayilpeelikkavu (1998) as Karthu
 Manthri Kochamma (1998) as Padmavathi
 Ennu Swantham Janakikuty (1998) as Janakikutty's mother
 Oro Viliyum Kaathorthu (1998) as Karthyayani
 Siddartha (1998) as Siddartha' mother
 Ormacheppu (1998) as Jeevan's sister in law
  Paava (1999)  
 Njangal Santhushtaranu (1999) as Women's Commission Member
 Niram (1999) as Prakash's mother
 Vaazhunnor (1999) as Mary Chandni/Alice
 Prempujari (1999) as Murali's mother
 Ezhupunna Tharakan (1999) as Mathew's wife
 Chandamama (1999) as Thresia
 Sparsham (1999) as Mahesh's mother
 Narasimham (2000) as Jayalakshmi teacher
 Sahayathrikakku Snehapoorvam (2000) as Hostel warden
 Varnakkaazhchakal (2000) as Subhadra
 Vinayapoorvam Vidyaadharan (2000) as Latha's mother
 Mera Naam Joker (2000) as Vishalakshi
 Swayamvarapanthal (2000) as Priya's mother
 Life Is Beautiful (2000) as Anil's mother
 Darling Darling (2000) as Padmaja's mother
 Valietten (2000) as Bava's wife 
 Daivathinte Makan (2000) as  Soniya's mother
 Cover Story (2000) as Advocate
 Pilots (2000) as Cicily
 Bhadra (2001) as Jayadevan's mother
 Naranathu Thampuran (2001) as Sridevi's mother
 Vakkalathu Narayanankutty (2001) as Kurien's wife
 Praja (2001) as Minister Giirja
 Bharthavudyogam (2001) as Sulochana
 Nagaravadhu (2001) as Akkama Tharakan
 Karumadikkuttan (2001) 
 Theerthadanam (2001) as Vinodhini's mother
 Kanmashi (2002) as Anandavalli
 Kunjikoonan (2002) 
 India Gate (2002) as Mrs.Viswanathan 
 Onnaman (2002) as Suhara's mother
 Melvilasam Sariyanu (2003) as Anjali's mother
 Pulival Kalyanam (2003) as Paramanandam's wofe
 Hariharan Pillai Happy Aanu (2003) as Ramani
 Parayam (2004)
 Mayilattam (2004) as Ponnamma
 Swarna Medal (2004) as Jameela
 Youth Festival (2004) as Arjun's mother
 Kakkakarumban (2004) as Rameshan's stepmother
 Kanninum Kannadikkum (2004) as Actress
 Chathikkatha Chanthu (2004) as Vasumathi's relative
 Freedom (2004) as Janaki
 Deepangal Sakshi (2005)
 Pauran (2005) as Dr. Ponnamma
 Lokanathan IAS (2005) as Lokanathan's elder sister
 Annorikkal (2005) as Myna's mother
 Kochirajavu(2005) as Kunjamma
 Athbhutha Dweepu (2005) as Arundhathi
 Videsi Nair Swadesi Nair (2005) as Padmavathi
 Ben Johnson (2005) as Madhavan Menon's wife
 Yes Your Honour  (2006) as Ravishankar's sister in law
 Rashtram (2006) as MLA
 Balram vs. Tharadas (2006) as Saleem's mother 
 Lion (2006) as Adv. Mercy Mathew
 Thuruppugulan (2006) as Dance teacher
 Kisan (2006) as Minister's PA
 Pothan Vava (2006) as Antochan's wife
 Baba Kalyani (2006) as Women's Commission member 
 Athishayan (2007) as Yunus Kunju's wife
 Bharathan Effect (2007) as Karia's wife 
 Kaakki (2007) as Padmini
 Changathipoocha (2007) 
 Panthaya Kozhi (2007)
 Arputha Theevu (2007) as Arundhati
 Nasrani (2007) as Guest
 Nanma (2007) as Karuppakam
 Black Cat (2007) as Susie's mother
 Anamika (2007) as Rachel's mother
 Inspector Garud (2007) as Women's Commission member, Malathy Varma
 Kabbadi Kabbadi (2008) as Panchayat President
 Detective (2007) as Reshmi's mother
 Shakespeare M.A. Malayalam (2008) as Omana
 Gopalapuranam (2008) as Kunjibeevi
 Bullet (2008) as Gayathri's aunt
 Aandavan (2008) as Prostitute
 Twenty:20 (2008) as Sobha
 Black Dalia (2009) as Vivek's mother
 Oru Black and White Kudumbam (2009) as Rahul's mother
 Neelambari (2010) as Kannamma
 Cheriya Kallanum Valiya Policum (2010) as Seelavathi
 Pokkiri Raja (2010) as Mayor's wife
 Advocate Lakshmanan - Ladies Only (2010) as Saramma
 Marykkundoru Kunjaadu (2010) as Chantha Maria
 Sarkar Colony (2011) as Colony resident
 Teja Bhai & Family (2011) as Manikutty
 Kottarathil Kutty Bhootham (2011)
 Njaan Sanchaari (2011)
 Kanakompathu (2011) as Hotel resident
 Collector (2011) as Avinash's sister
 Beautiful (2011) as Ammini
 The Metro (2011)  as Achayan's wife
 Manushyamrugam (2011) as Lissy's mother
 Vaadhyar (2012) as Teacher
 Navagatharkku Swagatham (2012) as Actress
 Padmasree Bharat Dr. Saroj Kumar (2012) as Neelima's friend
 Doctor Innocentanu (2012) as Komalavalli
 Mayamohini (2012) as Dr. Susamma Antony
 Mr. Marumakan (2012) as Club member
 Thanichalla Njan (2012) as 
 Gruhanathan (2012) as Colony resident
 Thappana (2012) as Annamma
 Trivandrum Lodge (2012) as School principal
 Naughty Professor (2012) as Karthika's mother
 Run Baby Run (2012) as Benny's mother
 Chettayees(2012) as Flat resident
 Ajantha (2012) 
 101 Weddings (2012) as Bride
 Honey Bee (2013) as Ferno's mother
 Romans(2013) as Mathukutty's mother
 Immanuel (2013) as Chandy's wife
 Pullipulikalum Aattinkuttiyum(2013) as Soshamma
 Sringara Velan (2013) as Aiswarya Rani
 Hotel California (2013) as Susy's mother
 Perunnal Nilavu (2013) as Roulath 
 Good Idea (2013) 
 Zachariayude Garbhinikal (2013) as Settu's wife
 Pigman (2013) as Sister Maria
 Kutteem Kolum (2013) as Kaimal's wife
 Nadodimannan (2013) as Minister's wife
 Malayala Nadu (2013) as Bharathi
 Punyalan Agarbattis (2013) as Usha
 Bad Boys (2014) 
 On the Way (2014) as Manju's mother
 Nakshathrangal (2014) as Saraswathi
 Kuruthamkettavan (2014) as Veroinca
 Njannanu Party (2014) as Krishnakumar's mother
 Salaam Kashmier (2014) as Lakshmi Kurup
 Polytechnic (2014) as Health officer
 Avatharam (2014) as Manimegha's aunt 
 Cousins (2014) as Poly's mother
 3 Wikkattinu 365 Runs as Chandy's wife
 Wonderful Jounrney (2015) as
 Uthara Chemmeen (2015) as Kochukkali
 Aana Mayil Ottakam (2015)
 Six (2015) as Nurse Mrinalini
 Just Married (2015) as Shakeela's umma
 Ivan Maryadaraman (2015) as Jayabharathi
 Amar Akbar Anthony (2015) as Gouri's mother
 Puthiya Niyamam (2016) as Anuradha
 Anyarku Praveshanamilla (2016) as Mariya
 Jalam (2016) as Secretary
 Pa Va (2016) as Theyyamma
 Popcorn (2016) as Janaki 
 Thodari (2016) as Srisha's mother (Tamil Movie)
 Honey Bee 2: Celebrations (2017) as Ferno's mother
 Achayans (2017) as Tony's mother
 Punyalan Private Limited (2017) as Usha Thenginchodu
 Basheerinte Premalekhanam (2017) as Teacher
 Honey bee 2.5(2017) as Herself
 Masterpiece (2017) as Sister Jacinta
 Vikadakumaran (2018)
 Naam (2018) as Molly John
 Oru Pazhaya Bomb Kadha (2018) as Joseph's wife
 Ennaalum Sarath..? (2018) as Sarath's mother
 Laughing Apartment Near Girinagar (2018) as Thankam
 Oru Kuttanadan Blog (2018) as Sharada 
 Chalakkudykkaran Changathy (2018) as Sharada
 Poovalliyum Kunjadum (2019) as Achamma
 Fancy Dress (2019) as Cicily
 Mask (2019) as Mary
 Old is Gold (2019) as Thaatha
 Oru Yamandan Premakatha (2019) as College principal
 Children's Park  (2019) as Korah's wife
 Brother's Day (2019) as Susanna George
 Mr. Pavanayi 99.99 (2019) as Eli
 Edakkad Battalion 06 (2019) as Shankaran's mother
 Jack & Daniel (2019) as Padma Shenoy
 Dhamaka (2020) as Valyammachi
 Black Coffee (2021) as Sumi
 Alice in Panchalinadu (2021) 
 China Trophy

Serials
Mrs. Hitler (Zee Keralam)- 2021
 Arayannangalude Veedu (FLOWERS TV)- 2018
Prekshakare Avashyamunde (MAZHAVIL MANORAMA)- 2016
Kochappy Tower Kottayam 18 (Kaumudy TV)- 2014
Vallarpadathamma(Shalom)- 2011
 Nandhanam (SURYA TV)- 2007
 Priyamanasi (SURYA TV)- 2008
 Sthree -(ASIANET)  2000
Kayamkulam Kochunni- (Surya TV) 2004-2007
 Ladies Corner- 2004
 Calling Bell- 2006
 Iniyonnu Visramikkatte- DD Malayalam
 Manassariyathe- 2006
 Swantham-  2004
 Chilluvilakku (Surya TV) 2008
 Samayam (Asianet)- 1999
 Sreeraman Sreedevi (Asianet -) 2000
 Ettu Sundarikalum Njanum- 2006
 Santhanagopalam (Asianet-) 2005
 Sanmanassullavarkku Samadhanam (ASIANET)- 2006
 Veruthe Oru Bharthavu(ASIANET)- 2010
Cinemala (ASIANET)- 2009
Valayam  (DD Malayalam)- 2001

References

External links

Ponnamma Babu at MSI

Actresses in Malayalam cinema
People from Pala, Kerala
Indian film actresses
Actresses from Kerala
Living people
Malayalam comedians
Indian women comedians
Indian television actresses
Actresses in Malayalam television
20th-century Indian actresses
21st-century Indian actresses
1963 births
Actresses in Tamil cinema